Sfazù is a hamlet in the upper part of the Val Poschiavo in the canton of Graubünden, Switzerland.

Sfazù is a small hamlet with two houses, a restaurant and a hotel.

References

Poschiavo
Val da Camp
Villages in Switzerland